Nessuno come noi is a 2018 Italian romantic drama film directed by Volfango De Biasi.

Cast

References

External links

2018 films
Films directed by Volfango De Biasi
Films produced by Fulvio Lucisano
2010s Italian-language films
2018 drama films
Italian romantic drama films
2010s Italian films